The 2018 Joe McDonagh Cup was the inaugural staging of the Joe McDonagh Cup since its establishment by the Gaelic Athletic Association. The fixtures were announced on 13 April 2018. The competition began on 5 May 2018.

On 1 July 2018, Carlow won the title following a 2-26 to 1-24 defeat of Westmeath in the final. This was their second successive promotion within the various tiers of hurling, as they were also the 2017 Christy Ring Cup champions.

Meath were relegated from the Joe McDonagh Cup after losing all of their group stage games.

Antrim's Neil McManus was the competition's top scorer with 3-67.

Teams

A total of six teams compete in the Joe McDonagh Cup, with representatives from Leinster (4), Munster (1) and Ulster (1). As 2018 was the inaugural year, four of the teams ( Kerry, Laois, Meath and Westmeath) previously played in the qualifier group of the 2017 Leinster Championship (tier 1) and two teams (Antrim and Carlow) were the finalists in the 2017 Christy Ring Cup (then tier 2, re-classified as tier 3 for 2018).

Format

All six teams compete in an initial round-robin of five rounds where teams play each other once. The top two teams after the round robin stage play the third-placed teams in the Leinster and Munster championships in the two All-Ireland preliminary quarter finals with the Joe McDonagh Cup teams having home advantage.

The top two teams also compete in the Joe McDonagh Cup final. If the winner is a non-Munster team, they are automatically promoted to the following year's Leinster Championship. If the winner is a Munster team, in effect Kerry, they must win a play-off with the bottom-placed team in the Munster Championship to gain promotion to the following year's Munster Championship.

In order to reduce the number of teams in the Joe McDonagh Cup to five in 2019, the bottom-placed team in the Joe McDonagh Cup are automatically relegated to the following year's Christy Ring Cup and will not be replaced. The team that finishes second last in the 2018 Joe McDonagh Cup plays off against the 2018 Christy Ring Cup champions. The winner of that game plays in the Joe McDonagh Cup in 2019 and the losing team plays in the 2019 Christy Ring Cup.

Group stage

Table

Rounds 1 to 5

Round 1

Round 2

Round 3

Round 4

Round 5

Final

Carlow are promoted to the 2019 All-Ireland Senior Hurling Championship.

Relegation/Promotion play-off

The bottom team after the round robin games, Meath, were relegated to the 2019 Christy Ring Cup. The second-last team in the Joe McDonagh Cup (tier 2), Antrim, defeated Kildare, the winners of the 2018 Christy Ring Cup final (tier 3) and thereby retained their place in the Joe McDonagh Cup for the 2019 edition.

Statistics

Top scorers

Overall

In a single game

Scoring Events 

 Widest winning margin: 16 points
 Meath 2-18 - 5-25 Antrim (Round 1)
 Most goals in a match: 7
 Meath 2-18 - 5-25 Antrim (Round 1)
 Most points in a match: 50
 Westmeath 1-24 - 2-26 Carlow (Final)
 Most goals by one team in a match: 5
 Meath 2-18 - 5-25 Antrim (Round 1)
 Most points by one team in a match: 26
 Westmeath 1-24 - 2-26 Carlow (Final)
 Highest aggregate score: 64 points
 Meath 2-18 - 5-25 Antrim (Round 1)
 Lowest aggregate score: 33 points
 Kerry 0-15 - 2-12 Westmeath (Round 3)

Miscellaneous
 Carlow become the first county to win the Joe McDonagh Cup.
 Carlow won their 2nd championship in a row after winning the 2017 Christy Ring Cup.
 Westmeath's round 1 victory over Laois was their first win against the O'Moore county in championship hurling since 1968.

References

Joe McDonagh Cup
Joe McDonagh Cup